Max Jordan (later Father Placid Jordan - April 21, 1895 in Sanremo, Italy   - November 1977) was a pioneering radio journalist for the NBC network in Europe in the 1930s. Later, he became a Benedictine monk.

Early life and career
He received a PhD in Religious Philosophy from the University of Jena. He worked for William Randolph Hearst's newspapers in the 1920s.

He covered many important stories (and had many scoops) in the 1930s, when the medium of radio was still relatively new. His first report for NBC was on a 1931 speech by German President Paul von Hindenburg. Jordan  also reported on the first Atlantic flight of the Hindenburg in 1936, the Anschluss of Austria in 1938, the text of that year's Munich Agreement (giving Germany the ethnically-German regions of Czechoslovakia), the 1940 invasion of France, and the 1945 surrender of Japan.

In 1931, he became domiciled in Arlesheim, Canton of Basel-Landschaft. In 1939 he became a US citizen

He also hired Martin Agronsky in 1940 to cover the war.

Horten stated that part of Jordan's success was his networking with the governments of Germany, Austria, and Hungary, which provided NBC "privileged use" of their broadcasting facilities.

During the war, he worked on NBC's religious shows, which included prayers, bible stories, and a series about military Chaplainship, Chaplain Jim.

Monk
Around 1954, he joined the Beuron Abbey, in Germany. He became a monk and took the name of Placid Jordan. He would later argue (in print) against Gordon Zahn's assertions that the Catholic Church had not properly resisted Nazism. Specifically, Jordan wrote responses to Zahn's papers regarding the Catholic Church and Nazi Germany. He also wrote a letter to William F. Buckley Jr.'s magazine National Review that was critical of Zahn's book German Catholics and Hitler's Wars.

Jordan died in 1977.

See also
Fred Bate
Edward R Murrow
William Shirer

Notes

External links
Max Jordan -- NBC's Forgotten Pioneer, by Elizabeth McLeod
Photos of Dr Jordan from Rex Features

1895 births
1977 deaths
American male journalists
American radio reporters and correspondents
Benedictine monks
University of Jena alumni
Officers Crosses of the Order of Merit of the Federal Republic of Germany